Naomi Halman (born 10 January 1986) is a Dutch basketball player who plays for Triple Threat of the Women's Basketball League (WBL). During her career, she also played for the Netherlands national team, playing in 44 international games.

Professional career
Halman played four seasons for Montpellier in the French LFB and the EuroLeague Women. She retired in 2018 when she got pregnant from her daughter.

In July 2020, Halman returned out of retirement to join Triple Threat, a team from her hometown Haarlem, for its debut in the Women's Basketball League.

Personal
Halman is the daughter of Eddy Halman, a former baseball player who played for the Dutch national team.

References

External links

Profile at eurobasket.com

1986 births
Living people
Sportspeople from Haarlem
Dutch women's basketball players
Small forwards
Dutch people of Aruban descent